Zaiful Nizam bin Abdullah (born 24 July 1987) is a Singaporean professional footballer who plays as a goalkeeper for Singapore Premier League club Hougang United and the Singapore national team.

Club career

Gombak United

Zaiful began his professional football career with Gombak United in the S. League in 2006. His stint with the bulls ended after the club has dissolved in 2012.

Balestier Khalsa
In 2013, Zaiful signed for Balestier Khalsa and is the first choice and captain for the team. He made his 100 capped in the first match of the 2017 S.League against Warriors. He almost scored a goal with a free kick when the team was losing 1–2 to Warriors, his free kick came close and hit the post and the game resulted to a loss.

In 2014, Zaiful won the 2014 Singapore Cup with Balestier Khalsa.

During the 2021 Singapore Premier League, Zaiful started in 13 out 15 matches for Balestier.

On 14 August 2021 against a match against the Young Lions FC, Zaiful refused to substitute goalkeeper Zacharial Leong during half-time. Balestier was down 4-0 at half-time. He was subsequently suspended by the club following the match. On 19 August, Balestier Khalsa terminated Zaiful. During an interview, Zaiful revealed that he refused to substitute Leong to encourage him and regretted refusing to play.

Geylang International 
On 27 August 2021, Geylang International announced the signing of Zaiful as part of their goalkeeping squad.

In 2022, Zaiful won the Golden Glove during the 2022 Singapore Premier League Awards Night after keeping nine clean sheets during the 2022 Singapore Premier League season.

Hougang United 
Zaiful was unveiled as a Hougang United player on 17 January 2023 on the club's social medias. He made his debut on 19 February 2023 in the 2023 Community Shield in a 3-0 loss against Albirex Niigata.

International career
Zaiful got his first international call up by Singapore's head coach Bernd Stange for friendlies against Bangladesh and Brunei on 30 May and 6 June 2015 respectively. He made his international debut against Brunei on the 60th minute, replacing Izwan Mahbud.

He finally collected his second cap for the Lions in a friendly against Fiji on 11 September 2018, replacing Hassan Sunny in the 60th minute. Zaiful then collected his 3rd cap and pulled off a series of stunning saves against Oman in the AIRMARINE Cup Final.

Zaiful made his third appearance for the national team on 23 March 2019, against Oman in the finals of the AIRMARINE Cup 2019. He started the game and played the full 90 minutes. It eventually ended in a 1–1 draw but Singapore lost to Oman in penalties.

Others

Singapore Selection Squad
He was selected as part of the Singapore Selection squad for The Sultan of Selangor's Cup to be held on 6 May 2017.

Personal life 
Zaiful has two children.

Career statistics

Club
. Caps and goals may not be correct.

International

Honours

International 
Singapore U17
 Lion City Cup: 2004

Clubs 
Balestier Khalsa
 Singapore Cup: 2014
 League Cup: 2013

Individual 

 Singapore Premier League Golden Glove : 2022

References

1987 births
Living people
Singaporean footballers
Association football goalkeepers
Gombak United FC players
Balestier Khalsa FC players
Singapore Premier League players
Singapore international footballers
Competitors at the 2021 Southeast Asian Games
Southeast Asian Games competitors for Singapore